Mutharika may refer to:

Bingu wa Mutharika, born Brightson Webster Ryson Thom (1934–2012), Malawian politician and economist, President of Malawi from May 2004 until his death in April 2012
Callista Mutharika, also known as Callista Chimombo, (born 24 May 1959), Malawian politician and the widow of President Bingu wa Mutharika
Ethel Mutharika (c. 1944 – 2007), First Lady of Malawi and wife of the President of Malawi, Bingu wa Mutharika
Peter Mutharika (born 1940), Malawian politician, educator and lawyer, President of Malawi since 31 May 2014